Leonard Osborn (11 November 1914 – 28 September 1994) was an English opera singer and actor, best known for his portrayal of the tenor roles in the Savoy Operas with the D'Oyly Carte Opera Company.  An accomplished actor and dancer, he later became a stage director for the company.

Life and career
Leonard Alfred George Osborn was born in Tooting, London, England. He performed in amateur Gilbert and Sullivan productions and worked as a chemist before joining D'Oyly Carte as a tenor chorister in 1937 (the company was paying choristers more than his old job). During his first season with the company, he was given the small role of First Yeoman (and, occasionally played the slightly larger role of Leonard Meryll) in The Yeomen of the Guard.  In 1938, he added the roles of the Defendant in Trial by Jury and Francesco in The Gondoliers. He also substituted as Earl Tolloller in Iolanthe in 1939.   In 1940, he continued to play the Defendant and chorus roles.

He joined the Royal Air Force in July 1940, where he sang in many military concerts.  In 1946, after the end of World War II, he rejoined D'Oyly Carte as principal tenor, immediately playing Tolloller and Nanki-Poo in The Mikado.  From 1946 to 1959, he regularly played the roles of the Defendant, the Duke of Dunstable in Patience, Tolloller, Colonel Fairfax in The Yeomen of the Guard, Marco in The Gondoliers, Mr. Box in Cox and Box, Richard Dauntless in Ruddigore (his favourite role), and, from 1954, Cyril in Princess Ida. Reviewing Iolanthe in 1951, The Times wrote, "Mr. Leonard Osborn's tenor voice has a ring and a line that did justice to 'Blue Blood'." The Gramophone called Osborn "one of the most melodious Ralph Rackstraws that the D'Oyly Carte Company have ever produced … finely characterised, beautifully enunciated and with some ringing top notes."

Osborn left the D'Oyly Carte company in November 1959, to enter the retail business in Surrey, occasionally directing amateur productions.  In 1975, during the company's centennial season, Osborn was invited to participate in the final performance of Trial by Jury, in which the regular D'Oyly Carte chorus was augmented by fourteen former stars of the company.

In 1977 he rejoined the company as stage director for Princess Ida for the Sadler's Wells special Jubilee season.  In September of that year, Queen Elizabeth II's Jubilee Year, the company gave a Royal Command Performance at Windsor Castle, directed by Osborn.  He served as production director for the D'Oyly Carte Opera Company until 1980.

Osborn died in London at the age of 79.

Recordings
Osborn sang in all but one of Decca's eleven D'Oyly Carte recordings made between 1949 and 1955. His recorded roles were the Defendant in Trial by Jury (1949), Ralph Rackstraw in H.M.S. Pinafore (1949), Frederic in The Pirates of Penzance (1950), Nanki-Poo in The Mikado (1950), Marco in The Gondoliers (1950), Richard Dauntless in Ruddigore (1951),  Fairfax in The Yeomen of the Guard (1951), Tolloller in Iolanthe (1952), the Duke in Patience (part only) (1952), and Cyril in Princess Ida (1955).

Notes, references and sources

Notes

References

Sources

External links
Profile of Osborn
Photos of Osborne in Iolanthe
Discussion of Osborn and his recordings

1914 births
1994 deaths
20th-century British male opera singers